A bluebird is one of several species in the songbird genus Sialia.

Bluebird or blue bird may also refer to:

Birds
Bluebird of happiness
Fairy-bluebird

Brands, companies and organizations
bluebird bio, a biotechnology firm
Blue Bird Bakeries, a brand name of Flowers Foods
Bluebird Foods, a New Zealand division of the U.S. based PepsiCo corporation
Bluebird Garage, a restaurant in London, formerly a racing garage 
Bluebird Records, a subsidiary label of RCA Records
Bluebird Toys, a British toy company
Project BLUEBIRD, the precursor to Project MKULTRA
Bluebird by American Express, a prepaid debit card
Nissan Bluebird,  Nissan's compact car
Blue Bird Corporation, an American bus manufacturer
Blue Birds, youngest members of the Camp Fire Girls

Transportation
Bluebird Rail Operations, railway rolling stock manufacturer in Australia
Bluebird Vehicles, a former British minibus manufacturer
Blue Bird Group an Indonesian transportation company

Aviation
 Bluebird Airways, a Greek airline
 Bluebird Aviation, a Kenyan charter airline 
 Blue Bird Aviation, a Sudanese charter airline
 Bluebird Nordic, an Icelandic cargo airline

Comics
Bluebird (Marvel Comics), a supporting character in Marvel Comics' Spider-Man series
Bluebird (DC Comics), a supporting character in DC Comics' Batman series

Film and TV
The Blue Bird (1910 film), a British silent film starring Pauline Gilmer and Olive Walter 
The Blue Bird (1918 film), an American silent film directed by Maurice Tourneur
The Blue Bird (1940 film), an American fantasy film
The Blue Bird (1976 film), a joint Soviet-American production directed by George Cukor
Bluebird (2004 film), a Dutch television film directed by Mijke de Jong
Blue Bird (2011 film), a 2011 Belgian drama film
Bluebird (2013 film), an American film directed by Lance Edmands
Bluebirds (TV series), a TV series by the BBC

Locations
Bluebird Cafe, a music club in Nashville, Tennessee
Bluebird Creek, a stream in Iowa
Bluebird Gap, a gap in Georgia
Bluebird Gap Farm, a public city park and petting zoo located in Hampton, Virginia
Bluebird Gold Mine, a gold mine in Western Australia
Blue Bird Inn, a jazz club in Detroit

Music
Sinyaya Ptitsa (The Blue Bird), a Soviet music group, vocal and instrumental ensemble (VIA)

Albums
Bluebird (Hank Jones album), 1956
Bluebird (Emmylou Harris album), 1989
Bluebird (Dawn Landes album), 2014
Blue Bird (Charles Mingus album), 1970
Blue Bird (EP), a 2013 extended play by Shouta Aoi
Bluebird (James Last album), 1982
Beyond the Blue Bird, a 1990 album by Tommy Flanagan

Songs
"Bluebird" (Buffalo Springfield song), 1967
"Bluebird" (Paul McCartney song), 1973
"Bluebird" (Anne Murray song), 1990
"Blue Bird" (Ayumi Hamasaki song), 2006
"Blue Bird" (Korean folk song)
"Blue Bird" (Russian folk song)
"Bluebird" (Miranda Lambert song), 2019
"Bluebird", by The Boo Radleys
"Bluebird", by Beach House from Depression Cherry
"Bluebird", by Christina Perri from Lovestrong
"Bluebird", by Dawn Landes from Bluebird, 2014
"Bluebird", by Electric Light Orchestra from Secret Messages
"Bluebird", by Helen Reddy from No Way to Treat a Lady
"Bluebird", by Ikimono-gakari from My Song Your Song
"Bluebird", by Jim White from Drill a Hole in That Substrate and Tell Me What You See
"Bluebird", by Katie Noonan from Skin
"Bluebird", by Little Big Town from Nightfall
"Bluebird", by Sara Bareilles from Kaleidoscope Heart
"Bluebird", by Spencer Krug from Beast Moans
"Bluebirds", by Adam Green from Friends of Mine
"The Blue Bird", by Charles Villiers Stanford
"Blue Bird", by Cassie Steele from How Much for Happy
"Blue Bird", by Kobukuro
"Bluebird", by Something for Kate from The Modern Medieval, 2020

Sports
A nickname for a member of Barrow A.F.C.
Bluebird (horse), a Thoroughbred racehorse
A nickname for a member of Cardiff City F.C.
A nickname for a member of Chippenham Town F.C.
One of the Bluebird record-breaking vehicles used by Malcolm Campbell and Donald Campbell to set water and land speed records

Transportation 
 The Blue Bird (train), a passenger train operated by the Wabash Railroad
 Blue Bird Corporation, an American manufacturer of buses, large passenger vehicles
 Blue Bird Group, an Indonesian transportation company
 Bluebird Bus and Coach, a bus operator in Greater Manchester, England
 Stagecoach Bluebird, a bus operator in Scotland
 Bluebird Cargo, a cargo airline based in Reykjavík, Iceland
 Bluebird Compartment Car (New York City Subway car)
 Blackburn Bluebird, a British aircraft
 Nissan Bluebird, a car manufactured by the Nissan Motor Company
 Nissan Bluebird Sylphy, a successor of Nissan Bluebird
 Nickname for two types of New York City subway cars in their original paint scheme:
 R33 World's Fair (New York City Subway car)
 R36 World's Fair (New York City Subway car) 
 South Australian Railways Bluebird railcar
 , the name of various United States Navy ships
 Blue Bird Coach Lines, now a part of Coach USA
 List of Bluebird record-breaking vehicles
 Bullitt Bluebird and Bluebird '71, blue colored versions of the cargo bicycle of Larry vs Harry, Denmark

Other uses
 L'Oiseau bleu (Metzinger) (The Blue Bird), a 1912–13 Cubist painting by Jean Metzinger
The Blue Bird (play), a play by Maurice Maeterlinck
Bluebirds (Australian nurses), a group of Australian civilian nurses who served in French hospitals during World War I
Blue bird, a cocktail made with gin

See also
The Blue Bird (disambiguation)
Bleubird (born 1982), an American rapper